Takai is a Japanese surname. Notable people with the surname include:

Fernanda Takai (born 1971), Brazilian singer
, Japanese footballer
, Japanese idol and singer
Mark Takai (1967–2016), American politician
, Japanese politician
Teri Takai, American politician
, Japanese baseball player
, Japanese judoka
, Japanese baseball player
, Japanese writer

Japanese-language surnames